The 33rd Wisconsin Infantry Regiment was a volunteer infantry regiment that served in the Union Army during the American Civil War.

Service
The 33rd Wisconsin was organized at Racine, Wisconsin, and mustered into Federal service October 18, 1862.

The regiment was mustered out on August 8, 1865.

Casualties
The 33rd Wisconsin suffered 3 officers and 30 enlisted men killed in action or who later died of their wounds, plus another 2 officers and 167 enlisted men who died of disease, for a total of 202 fatalities.

Commanders
 Colonel Jonathan Baker Moore
 Lt. Colonel Frederick S. Lovell
 Lt. Colonel Horatio H. Virgin

Notable members
 Robert H. DeLap, Wisconsin politician
 Frederick S. Lovell, was lieutenant colonel, later became colonel of the 46th Wisconsin Infantry Regiment and received an honorary brevet to brigadier general.  Before the war he was a Wisconsin legislator.
 William Warner, Missouri politician

See also

 List of Wisconsin Civil War units
 Wisconsin in the American Civil War

References

External links
The Civil War Archive

Military units and formations established in 1862
Military units and formations disestablished in 1865
Units and formations of the Union Army from Wisconsin
1862 establishments in Wisconsin